The Vindelici were a Gallic people dwelling around present-day Augsburg (Bavaria) during the Iron Age and the Roman period.

Name 
,) by Pliny (1st c.

The ethnonym  a latinized form of Gaulish  (sing. ). A hydronym  is mentioned by Florus as an alternative name of the Soulgas (Sorgue), in southeastern France. Alternatively, Patrizia de Bernardo Stempel has proposed to translate the name as 'those from the white rocks', by deriving the second element from Gaulish  ('flat stone').

Geography 
The Vindelici lived on the Upper Bavarian-Upper Swabian plateau, probably also in Vorarlberg and Tyrol, in a land stretching from the southern slopes of the Alps up to the Danube river. They later occupied the eastern part of the province of Raetia, in a region known by Ptolemy as Vindelicia. Their territory was located west of the Catenates, south of the Raetovarii, north of the Licates.

Their chief town during the Roman period was known as Augusta Vindelicum or Aelia Augusta (modern Augsburg). A first Roman military camp was occupied from 10 BC up until ca. 15 AD, when it was probably destroyed by flooding and relocated to the south. The second fort, abandoned in the 70–80s, was rapidly covered by the expanding civilian settlement. Augusta Vindelicum served at a time as the capital of Raetia and the residence of the provincial governor. It obtained the status of municipium under the emperor Hadrian (117–138 AD). From the reign of Diocletian (284–305), the city became the capital of Raetia secunda.

Political organization 
In the narrow sense, the Vindelician people comprised four sub-tribes, listed on the Tropaeum Alpium: the Cosuanetes, Rucinates, Licates and Catenates.

In a broader sense, they included, as counted by Strabo, the Licates, Clautenatii, Vennones, Estiones, and Brigantii, although this classification has been criticized as doubtful by some scholars. Rather than sub-tribes, they may have rather been pagi or clients of the Vindelici.

Despite the proximity of Augusta Vindelicum, the Vindelici were only partially Romanized.

History 
They are mentioned by Pliny the Elder as one of the Alpine tribes conquered by Rome in 16–15 BC, and whose name was engraved on the Tropaeum Alpium.

See also
Oppidum of Manching
Pfostenschlitzmauer
Viereckschanze

References

Primary sources

Bibliography 

Historical Celtic peoples
Germany in the Roman era
Gauls
History of Bavaria
Tribes conquered by Rome
History of Swabia
History of Augsburg